Minami Kōen Station (南公園駅) is a railway station in Hyōgo Prefecture.  It is located on the Port Liner in Chūō-ku, Kobe, Japan.  Minami Kōen  literally means South Park in English. The station has also the nickname IKEA-mae (IKEA前) as it's close to an IKEA store. 

The station has only one track as it's on the loop section of Port Liner with one-way traffic only.

Stations next to Minami Kōen
Portliner
Local (普通)
Shimin-Hiroba (P06) → Minami Kōen (PL07) → Naka Futō (PL08)

Railway stations in Kobe